The Train Has Reached Amritsar (Hindi original: Amritsar Aa Gaya Hai) is a short story by Hindi author and playwright, Bhisham Sahni set during the Partition of India. In the story a group of refugees are travelling from what has now become Pakistan towards Amritsar, the first border town in India, and the horrors and destruction they witness on the journey. Sahni also wrote his epic novel Tamas (Darkness, 1974) around partition, which was later adapted to a television film, by Govind Nihalani.

An English translation by Ashok Bhalla, was also part of the anthology, Stories of Partition of India (1994).

Adaptations
It was adapted into a Hindi stage play by theatre director, Vinod Kumar in 2011.

Translation
 We Have Arrived in Amritsar and Other Stories, Tr. by Ashok Bhalla. Stosius Inc/Advent Books Division. .

See also
 Artistic depictions of the partition of India

References

External links
 The Train Has Reached Amritsar, Excerpts

Indian short stories
Partition of India in fiction
Hindi-language literature
Transport in Amritsar
Novels set in Pakistan